The 2018 NCAA Division I baseball tournament began on Friday, June 1, 2018 as part of the 2018 NCAA Division I baseball season.  The 64-team, double-elimination tournament concluded with the 2018 College World Series in Omaha, Nebraska, starting on June 16 and ended on June 28. The Oregon State Beavers defeated the Arkansas Razorbacks in the best-of-three final series to win the championship.

The 64 participating NCAA Division I college baseball teams were selected out of an eligible 298 teams. Thirty-one teams will be awarded an automatic bid as champions of their conferences, and 33 teams will be selected at-large by the NCAA Division I Baseball Committee.

Teams were divided into sixteen regionals of four teams, which conducted a double-elimination tournament.  Regional champions competed in Super Regionals, a best-of-three-game series, to determine the eight participants in the College World Series.  For the first time, the Tournament seeded the top 16 teams instead of pairing teams generally along geographical lines.

In the championship series, Arkansas won the first game and held a 3–2 lead entering the top of the ninth inning in game 2.  With two outs and a runner on third, Oregon State shortstop Cadyn Grenier popped a foul ball down the right field line that multiple Razorback players appeared to have a play on.  Had the ball been caught, Arkansas would have won their first national championship in baseball; instead, the ball dropped between the first baseman, second baseman, and right fielder to continue the at-bat.  Two pitches later, with the Beavers down to their final strike, Grenier singled in the tying run, and was followed by Trevor Larnach's two-run homer to give OSU a 5–3 lead and the eventual victory to even the series.  The following day, Oregon State freshman Kevin Abel – who threw 23 pitches the previous night – notched a 129-pitch complete game shutout, allowing just two hits and retiring the final 20 Razorback hitters  to secure the Beavers' third national title in baseball.  Oregon State catcher Adley Rutschman was named College World Series Most Outstanding Player after collecting 13 RBI's and a College World Series record 17 hits.

Bids

Automatic bids

By conference

National seeds
16 National Seeds were announced on the Selection Show Monday, May 28 at 12 p.m. EDT on ESPNU. The 16 national seeds host the Regionals. Teams in italics advanced to Super Regionals. Teams in bold advanced to College World Series.

1. Florida

2. 

3. Oregon State

4. Ole Miss

5. Arkansas

6. North Carolina

7. 

8. 

9. Texas Tech

10. Clemson

11. 

12. 

13. Texas

14. 

15. Coastal Carolina

16. NC State

Regionals and Super Regionals
Bold indicates winner.  Seeds for regional tournaments indicate seeds within regional.  Seeds for super regional tournaments indicate national seeds only.

Gainesville Super Regional

Lubbock Super Regional

Fayetteville Super Regional

Austin Super Regional

Corvallis Super Regional

Chapel Hill Super Regional

Nashville Super Regional
Hosted by Vanderbilt at Hawkins Field

Fullerton Super Regional
Hosted by Cal State Fullerton at Goodwin Field

College World Series
The College World Series was held at TD Ameritrade Park in Omaha, Nebraska.

Participants

Bracket
Seeds listed below indicate national seeds only

Game results

All-Tournament Team
The following players were members of the College World Series All-Tournament Team.

Final standings
Seeds listed below indicate national seeds only

Record by conference

The columns RF, SR, WS, NS, CS, and NC respectively stand for the Regional Finals, Super Regionals, College World Series Teams, National Semifinals, Championship Series, and National Champion.

Nc is non–conference records, i.e., with the records of teams within the same conference having played each other removed.

Media coverage

Radio
NRG Media provided nationwide radio coverage of the College World Series through its Omaha station KOZN, in association with Westwood One. It was streamed at  westwoodonesports.com, on TuneIn, and on SiriusXM. Kevin Kugler and John Bishop called all games leading up to the Championship Series with Gary Sharp acting as the field reporter. The Championship Series was called by Kugler and Scott Graham with Bishop acting as field reporter.

Television
ESPN carried every game from the Regionals, Super Regionals, and College World Series across its networks. During the Regionals and Super Regionals ESPN offered a dedicated channel, ESPN Bases Loaded (carried in the same channel allotments as its "Goal Line" services for football), carried live look-ins and analysis across all games in progress.

Broadcast assignments

Regionals
Mike Morgan and Greg Swindell: Athens, Georgia
Tom Hart and Kyle Peterson: Austin, Texas
Brett Dolan and Scott Pose: Chapel Hill, North Carolina
Taylor Zarzour and Chris Burke: Clemson, South Carolina
Richard Cross and Jay Powell: Conway, South Carolina
Anish Shroff and JT Snow: Corvallis, Oregon
Mike Keith and Rusty Ensor: DeLand, Florida
Doug Sherman and John Gregory: Fayetteville, Arkansas
Super Regionals
Lowell Galindo and Keith Moreland: Austin, Texas
Roy Philpott and Todd Walker: Chapel Hill, North Carolina 
Clay Matvick and Mike Rooney: Corvallis, Oregon
Dave Neal, Chris Burke, and Ben McDonald: Fayetteville, Arkansas
College World Series
Tom Hart, Chris Burke, Ben McDonald, and Mike Rooney: Evenings June 17, 19–20; Afternoons June 16, June 18, June 22–23
Karl Ravech, Eduardo Pérez, Kyle Peterson, and Laura Rutledge: Evenings June 16, 21–23; Afternoons June 17, 19–20

Regionals
Steve Lenox and Nick Belmonte: Gainesville, Florida
Mike Couzens and Lance Cormier: Greenville, North Carolina
Lowell Galindo and Keith Moreland: Lubbock, Texas
Clay Matvick and Danan Hughes: Minneapolis, Minnesota
Sam Ravech and Ben McDonald: Oxford, Mississippi
Jim Barbar  and Troy Eklund: Raleigh, North Carolina
Roxy Bernstein and Wes Clements: Stanford, California
Dave Neal and Todd Walker: Tallahassee, Florida
Super Regionals
Mark Neely and Wes Clements: Fullerton, California
Dari Nowkhah and Eduardo Pérez: Gainesville, Florida
Mike Morgan and Lance Cormier: Lubbock, Texas
Tom Hart, Kyle Peterson, and Laura Rutledge: Nashville, Tennessee
College World Series Championship Series
Karl Ravech, Eduardo Pérez, Kyle Peterson, and Laura Rutledge

References

NCAA Division I Baseball Championship
Tournament
NCAA